Ethem Servet Boral (1876, in Caucasus – September 21, 1956?) was an officer of the Ottoman Army and the Turkish Army.

Medals and decorations
Order of Osmanieh 4th class
Order of the Medjidie 4th class
Gold Liakat Medal
Prussian Military Medal
Prussian Medal of Merit
Medal of Independence with Red Ribbon

See also
List of high-ranking commanders of the Turkish War of Independence

Sources

1876 births
1956 deaths
Turkish people of Circassian descent
Ottoman Military Academy alumni
Ottoman Military College alumni
Ottoman Army officers
Ottoman military personnel of the Balkan Wars
Ottoman military personnel of World War I
Turkish Army officers
Turkish military personnel of the Greco-Turkish War (1919–1922)
Burials at Turkish State Cemetery
Recipients of the Order of the Medjidie, 4th class
Recipients of the Liakat Medal
Recipients of the Medal of Independence with Red Ribbon (Turkey)